The electronics industry in China grew rapidly after the liberalization of the economy under the national strategic policy of accelerating the "informatization" of its industrial development. Subsequently, labour costs have risen and creating wealth for citizens. The industry has been a major contribution to the modernization of China and the development of new job opportunities. There are many instances of labour exploitation and subpar working conditions.

In 2005, China's electronic information sector made up 16.6% of the country's economic growth and its added-value output formed 7% of the GDP. Manufacturing was the sector that grew the fastest.

As of 2011, China is the world's largest market for personal computers.

Major Chinese electronics companies include BOE, Changhong, DJI, Haier, Hisense, Huawei, Konka, Lenovo(Hong Kong based), Meizu, Panda Electronics, Skyworth, SVA, TCL, Xiaomi, Oppo, and ZTE. 

China's production recorded the largest world market share for its electronics exports in 2016. It also recorded high volume outputs across a wide spectrum of consumer electronics; between 2014 and 2015—according to China Daily—286.2 million personal computers (90.6% of the global supply), 1.77 billion phones (70.6% of global supply of smartphones) and 109 million units (80% of global supply of air conditioners) were produced.

Overview
China's electronic information industry has grown three times faster than the national GDP growth rate and has grown faster than the machinery manufacturing and metallurgy industries.

The added-value base of the Chinese electronic information industry is about 900 billion yuan (approximately US$112 billion). The value added ratio is (amount of value added / total sales x 100%) only 23.4%, compared to the whole national average of 27.1%.

This is evidence for China's role as an assembly base that is dependent upon overseas components and parts, intermediary goods, and capital goods.

The number of electronic information industry-related companies in China jumped from 7,500 in 2001, to 17,600 in 2003 and 67,000 in 2005, with approximately 56,000 of these being manufacturing companies. The number of employees engaged in the industry grew from 3.01 million in 2001 to 4.08 million in 2003 and 7.61 million in 2005 (out of whom 5.51 million are employed in the manufacturing industry).

Structure
The main areas of China's electronic information industry are computer-related goods (including software), communication equipment, electronic parts and household entertainment equipment.

Electronic parts-related investment made up 50% of the total investment in the electronic information industry. Promotion of the electronic parts industry is a part of China's national industrial policy to raise the ratio of value added in the sector.

China's software industry – 11% of the electronic information industry – (software products, system integration, software services, and others) growth has been rapid as demonstrated by a growth rate of 40% with sales of 390 billion yuan (approximately ) as of 2006.

Approved software companies have reached 11,660, increasing by over 1,000 per annum. There are roughly 1 million employees working in China's software industry. China's software exports have reached  in 2005, though this was short of the  export goal set forth in the Tenth 5-Year Plan, which ended in 2005.

Market

Due to the expansion of the internal and external markets, the ratio of sales to production (sales rate) has remained at over 98%.

The vast majority of China's mobile phones, notebook computers, color displays and other products are exported, making China a global production base.

The ratio of total exports and total imports in China was 35.2% for exports and 33.4% for imports.

There has been no change in the essence of China's export-oriented industries.

As a whole, it is expected that large-scale growth will continue as before, though export-import growth has been set at a low rate of approximately 15%, taking into account the effects of the revaluation of the yuan.

Foreign firms
China's electronic information industry, like much of its economy, is both export-oriented and foreign capital-led.

In 2005, the sales, added value, profits, and exports of foreign firms (including 6,480 firms with 100% foreign capital, merged firms and joint firms) reached 2.4 trillion yuan, 503 billion yuan, 82.2 billion yuan, and US$234 billion, respectively, accounting for 77%, 77%, 77% and 87% of China's total electronic information industry for their respective categories. These figures are all considerably higher than 2004. The export surplus of  produced by 100% foreign capital firms (2,241 firms) accounted for 94% of China's total.

The total ratio of value added for foreign firms in China is 20.9%, however, which is far behind the 27.6% ratio of local firms. There has been no major change in foreign firms' strategy for using China as an assembly base. Recently, though, there has been increasing activity by foreign firms regarding local management centers and R&D bases, as well as in investment in the electronic parts industry.

Foreign investment and overseas investments in China's manufacturing industry shows that foreign investment has been decreasing year by year, It shows that China's manufacturing industry has become less attractive. In contrast, foreign investment has been increasing year by year that shows China's manufacturing industry is getting closer and closer to foreign countries.

See also
Economy of China
Telecommunications industry in China
Software industry in China

References

External links
China Electronics Corporation (CEC) - main state-owned industry corporation
China National Electronics Import and Export Corporation (CEIEC) - main international trade body affiliated with the CEC

Electronics industry in the People's Republic of China